The Canso Rocks are two rocks lying west of Bone Bay,  northwest of Notter Point on Belitsa Peninsula, Trinity Peninsula in Graham Land, Antarctica. They were named by the UK Antarctic Place-Names Committee after the Canso, one of the types of aircraft used by the Falkland Islands and Dependencies Aerial Survey Expedition (1955–57).

References 

Rock formations of the Trinity Peninsula